In airline ticketing, the term hacker fare can refer to one of these two things:
 Booking two one-way tickets to assemble a round trip, often on two different airlines (term coined by Kayak).
 Hidden-city ticketing

Airline tickets